Matthew Dea (born 13 October 1991) is a former professional Australian rules footballer who played for the Essendon Football Club in the Australian Football League (AFL). He made his debut against  in round 4 of 2010 season. In 2015, he won Richmond's VFL best and fairest award but was delisted in October.

In January 2016, Dea signed with the Essendon Football Club as one of their top-up players following the clubs' supplements controversy. Under the player top-up rules, he was delisted at the conclusion of the 2016 season, however, in November he re-signed with Essendon during the delisted free agency period.

Statistics
 Statistics are correct to the end of the 2016 season

|- style="background-color: #EAEAEA"
! scope="row" style="text-align:center" | 2010
|
| 43 || 3 || 0 || 0 || 7 || 24 || 31 || 5 || 10 || 0.0 || 0.0 || 2.3 || 8.0 || 10.3 || 1.7 || 3.3
|-
! scope="row" style="text-align:center" | 2011
|
| 43 || 4 || 0 || 0 || 15 || 21 || 36 || 12 || 9 || 0.0 || 0.0 || 3.8 || 5.3 || 9.0 || 3.0 || 2.3
|- style="background-color: #EAEAEA"
! scope="row" style="text-align:center" | 2012
|
| 7 || 14 || 0 || 0 || 78 || 87 || 165 || 53 || 23 || 0.0 || 0.0 || 5.6 || 6.2 || 11.8 || 3.8 || 1.6
|-
! scope="row" style="text-align:center" | 2013
|
| 7 || 3 || 0 || 0 || 18 || 13 || 31 || 12 || 5 || 0.0 || 0.0 || 6.0 || 4.3 || 10.3 || 4.0 || 1.7
|- style="background:#eaeaea;"
! scope="row" style="text-align:center" | 2014
|
| 7 || 7 || 1 || 0 || 45 || 44 || 89 || 22 || 10 || 0.1 || 0.0 || 6.4 || 6.3 || 12.7 || 3.1 || 1.4
|-
! scope="row" style="text-align:center" | 2016
|
| 49 || 21 || 0 || 1 || 218 || 139 || 357 || 132 || 48 || 0.0 || 0.0 || 10.4 || 6.6 || 17.0 || 6.3 || 2.3
|- class="sortbottom"
! colspan=3| Career
! 52
! 1
! 1
! 381
! 328
! 709
! 236
! 105
! 0.0
! 0.0
! 7.3
! 6.3
! 13.6
! 4.5
! 2.0
|}

References

External links

Matt Dea's statistics from Footy Wire

1991 births
Living people
Essendon Football Club players
Richmond Football Club players
Australian rules footballers from Victoria (Australia)
Greater Western Victoria Rebels players
Place of birth missing (living people)
Coburg Football Club players